Bashir Bhola Bhala (born 20 January 1971) is a Pakistani wrestler. He competed in the men's freestyle 90 kg at the 1996 Summer Olympics.

References

1971 births
Living people
Pakistani male sport wrestlers
Olympic wrestlers of Pakistan
Wrestlers at the 1996 Summer Olympics
Place of birth missing (living people)
Wrestlers at the 1994 Asian Games
Wrestlers at the 2006 Asian Games
Asian Games competitors for Pakistan
Commonwealth Games medallists in wrestling
Commonwealth Games bronze medallists for Pakistan
Wrestlers at the 2002 Commonwealth Games
20th-century Pakistani people
Medallists at the 2002 Commonwealth Games